Drinkwater is a surname.

Drinkwater may also refer to:

Drinkwater (film), a 2021 Canadian coming-of-age comedy film
Drinkwater, Saskatchewan, a village in Canada
Drinkwater Meadows (1799–1869), English actor

See also

Drinking water